John Kinsey (c.1842-1844 - December 19, 1904) was an American soldier and recipient of the Medal of Honor for his actions during the American Civil War.

Biography 
Kinsey was born in Lancaster County, Pennsylvania sometime during the early 1840s. He served as corporal in Company B of the 45th Pennsylvania Infantry Regiment in the Union Army. He earned his medal in action at the Battle of Spotsylvania Court House, Virginia on May 18, 1864. His medal was issued on March 2, 1897. He died in Indianapolis, Indiana on  December 19, 1904. He is buried in Crown Hill Cemetery, Indianapolis, Indiana.

Medal of Honor Citation 
For extraordinary heroism on 18 May 1864, in action at Spotsylvania, Virginia. Corporal Kinsey seized the colors, the Color Bearer having been shot, and with great gallantry succeeded in saving them from capture.

References 

1904 deaths
Year of birth uncertain